The Donoughmore Constitution, created by the Donoughmore Commission, served Sri Lanka (Ceylon) from 1931 to 1947 when it was replaced by the Soulbury Constitution.

It was a significant development. First, it was the only constitution in the British Empire (outside Dominions of Australia, South Africa and Canada) enabling general elections with adult universal suffrage. For the first time, a "dependent", non-caucasian country within the empires of Western Europe was given one-person, one-vote and the power to control domestic affairs. Here was the pilot project whose success would ensure freedom from colonial rule for whole swathes of Asia, Africa and the Caribbean.

Secondly, it created a committee system of government specifically to address the multi-ethnic problems of Sri Lanka. Under this system, no one ethnic community could dominate the political arena. Instead, every government department was overseen by a committee of parliamentarians drawn from all the ethnic communities. This created a built-in series of checks and balances, leading to continual 'pork-barrelling' and 'log-rolling', in which every ethnic group gained something. Consensual politics was thereby forced on Sri Lanka's reluctant political activists. Power and funding followed those with the ability to maximise broadbased multi-ethnic support: negotiators and peacemakers were therefore elevated above demagogues and warmongers.  

The Donoughmore Commissioners had been appointed by the socialist Sydney Webb. Webb was briefly the Secretary of State for the Colonies in the Lib-Lab coalition government of 1927. He appointed Commissioners whom he knew shared his desire for an equitable and socialist British empire and they in turn came up with a Constitutional arrangement for Sri Lanka, which would ensure that every community in the island had a chance of for power and prosperity.

References

Constitutions of Sri Lanka
Defunct constitutions
British Ceylon period
Sri Lankan Tamil history
1930s in Ceylon
1940s in Ceylon
1931 documents